NGC 588 is a diffuse nebula located in the outskirts of the galaxy Messier 33, within the Triangulum constellation. It was discovered October 2, 1861 by the German-Danish astronomer Heinrich d'Arrest.

References

External links 
 

Diffuse nebulae
Triangulum (constellation)
0588
Triangulum Galaxy
Astronomical objects discovered in 1861
Discoveries by Heinrich Louis d'Arrest